The following is a list of pipeline accidents in the United States in 2017. It is one of several lists of U.S. pipeline accidents. See also list of natural gas and oil production accidents in the United States.

Incidents 

This is not a complete list of all pipeline accidents. For natural gas alone, the Pipeline and Hazardous Materials Safety Administration (PHMSA), a United States Department of Transportation agency, has collected data on more than 3,200 accidents deemed serious or significant since 1987.

A "significant incident" results in any of the following consequences:
 fatality or injury requiring in-patient hospitalization
 $50,000 or more in total costs, measured in 1984 dollars
 liquid releases of five or more barrels (42 US gal/barrel)
 releases resulting in an unintentional fire or explosion

PHMSA and the National Transportation Safety Board (NTSB) post incident data and results of investigations into accidents involving pipelines that carry a variety of products, including natural gas, oil, diesel fuel, gasoline, kerosene, jet fuel, carbon dioxide, and other substances. Occasionally pipelines are repurposed to carry different products.

 On January 7, a Colonial Pipeline stubline leaked gasoline into Shoal Creek in Chattanooga, Tennessee.
 On January 14, the Ozark Pipeline, an Enbridge (now Marathon Oil) division, spilled about 18,900 gallons of light oil at the Lawrence Pump Station near Halltown, Missouri.
 On January 16, a gas pipeline exploded and burned near Spearman, Texas. There were no injuries. 
 On January 19, a Tallgrass Pony Express Pipeline failed in Logan County, Colorado, spilling about 420,300 gallons of crude oil. The cause of the failure was unknown.
 On January 25, a Magellan pipeline leaked 46,830 gallons (1,115 barrels) of diesel fuel onto private agricultural land in Worth County, Iowa near Hanlontown.
 On January 30, a Texas Department of Transportation crew dug into the 30-inch-diameter Seaway Pipeline near Blue Ridge, Texas, spraying crude oil across a road. About 210,000 gallons of crude were spilled. There were no injuries.
 On January 31, a DCP pipeline exploded under a runway at Panola County Airport-Sharpe Field in Texas. There were no injuries, but the airport shut the runway down for an extended amount of time.
 On February 9, a Phillips 66 natural gas liquids pipeline (TENDS pipeline Sorrento system) near the Williams-Discovery natural gas plant on US Route 90 near Paradis, Louisiana exploded while being cleaned, killing one worker and sending another worker to a burn unit. Traffic on US-90 and LA-631 was shut down, and residents in the area evacuated.
 On February 15, a 36-inch-diameter Kinder Morgan natural gas pipeline exploded and burned in Refugio County, Texas. There were no injuries. The flames were visible 50 miles away. Refugio County Chief Deputy Sheriff Gary Wright said the explosion occurred at an apparent weak point in the pipeline that must have required maintenance, but KM disputed the issue. Residents as far as 60 miles away thought it was an earthquake, while others described it as "a thunder roll that wouldn’t end.” According to the PHMSA incident listing, "the incident was most likely caused by some combination of stress factors on the pipeline." The explosion and resulting fire cost $525,197 in property damage. The pipe was installed in 1964.
 On February 27, a crude oil pipeline ruptured in Falls City, Texas, spilling about 42,630 gallons of crude oil. The cause was from internal corrosion.
On March 3, a leak on the Dakota Access Pipeline in Watford City, North Dakota spilled approximately 84 gallons of oil, contaminating local snow and soil. The leak was contained before it could reach any waterways.
On March 5, an oil spill due to an above-ground valve malfunction on the Dakota Access Pipeline occurred in Mercer County, North Dakota. An estimated 20 gallons were spilled.
 On March 29, a natural-gas leak of a high-pressure pipeline in Providence, Rhode Island owned by Spectra Energy released about 19 million cubic feet of natural gas, or enough natural gas to heat and keep the lights on for 190,000 homes for a single day. Approximately two gallons of polychlorinated biphenyls (PCBs) were also released in the form of contaminated natural gas condensate.
 On April 1, Energy Transfer Partners's Mariner East pipelines leaked about 840 gallons of an ethane-propane mix in Berks County, Pennsylvania. This, and several other incidents, later led to a $200,000 fine. There were no injuries.
 On April 4, a pump on the Dakota Access Pipeline spilled about 84 gallons of oil at a pump station in Tulare, South Dakota. The leak was not noticed until May 9.
 April 13 and 14: It was discovered that Energy Transfer Partners spilled drilling fluid into two separate wetlands in rural Ohio while constructing the Rover Pipeline. The spills occurred in wetlands near Richland County, Ohio. The spill on the 13th released 2 million gallons of drilling fluid, and the spill on the 14th released approximately 50,000 gallons of drilling fluid.
 On April 21, a Plains All American Pipeline experienced a crude oil release on the Buffalo Pipeline near Loyal, Oklahoma. About 19,000 gallons of crude oil were spilled.
 On April 22, a 1,050-gallon oil pipeline spill in Bowman County, North Dakota polluted a tributary of the Little Missouri River but was prevented from flowing into the larger waterway.
 On May 8, a Wood River Pipelines (part of Koch Industries) line broke in Warrensburg, Illinois, spilling 250 gallons of crude oil.
 On May 25, workers were installing a replacement pipeline at a tank battery near Mead, Colorado, when there was an explosion and fire. One worker was killed, and three others were injured. 
 On July 13, a contractor doing maintenance on Magellan's Longhorn Pipeline hit that pipeline in Bastrop County, Texas. About 87,000 gallons of crude oil were spilled, resulting in evacuations of nearby residents.
 On July 27, while installing a water pipeline by horizontal drilling, a contractor hit a ONEOK Natural Gas Liquids pipeline, spilling about 126,000 gallons of NGL's near Watford City, North Dakota.
 On August 2, a pipeline leaked up to 1,000 gallons of oil in Signal Hill, California.
 On August 2, a contractor ruptured a jet fuel pipeline in Parkland, Washington.
 On August 2, a natural gas explosion and fire struck the Minnehaha Academy in Minneapolis, Minnesota. Workers may have been moving a gas meter when the explosion hit, killing two people and injuring at least nine others, according to investigators.
 On September 22, a gas pipeline exploded and burned in Welda, Kansas. There were no injuries.
 On September 22, fire broke out at a substation of the Iroquois Pipeline, causing homes to be evacuated and about two miles of Route 37 to be shut down for several hours near Waddington, New York. The cause of the failure was never found.
 On October 18, Louisiana-based oil company LLOG Exploration had a crude oil spill of about 672,000 gallons 40 miles southeast of Venice, Louisiana, citing the cause as a cracked pipeline under the Gulf of Mexico.
 On October 23, at a facility owned by EDC-Timken, operated and maintained by Columbia Gas Transmission in Navarre, Ohio, an unintended natural gas release was noted by the onsite company personnel. While investigating the sound, the single bolt hinged closure that appeared to be the source of the release failed. The closure failure fatally injured one technician. The equipment was installed in 1989. The leak just south of Canton, Ohio, forced authorities to evacuate a neighborhood.
 On November 16, the Keystone Pipeline leaked crude oil near Amherst, South Dakota. The pipeline was shut down within 15 minutes of the leak's discovery. Later, the NTSB found a metal tracked vehicle had run over this section of pipeline, causing the damage. During cleanup activities, state officials say a semi-trailer driver hauling hazardous material to and from the Keystone oil pipeline leak site purposely dumped soil contaminated with crude oil on the side of a northeastern South Dakota road. The original estimate was increased to  spilled.
 On November 16, three men were injured in a gas pipeline fire in northeastern Weld County, Colorado. One later died of his injuries.
 On November 20, Kinder Morgan’s Connecticut Expansion Project's pipeline test at the Agawam, Massachusetts compressor station discharged 16,500 gallons of hazardous wastewater onto the soil of the compressor station yard; the wastewater contained heavy metals, lead, and carcinogens such as tetrachloroethylene and phthalate. Kinder Morgan blamed subcontractor Henkels & McCoy for an operator error.
 On November 20, a Consumers Energy 22-inch-diameter gas transmission pipeline carrying gas at 600 psi exploded and burned in Orion Township, Michigan, knocking out the county 911 system and causing some evacuations. There were no injuries.
 On November 29, in Richmond, Massachusetts, a Kinder Morgan pipeline overpressure triggered a relief valve to open, releasing natural gas for a blowdown that lasted 40 minutes and sounded like a jet engine. The gas escaped into a nearby residential neighborhood. Firefighters responded to the leak and closed the road. When contacted, pipeline personnel had no idea that there was a problem and offered no reason for their equipment malfunction.
 On December 5, a father and his adult son were killed when a stuck tractor they were trying to free ruptured and ignited a 20-inch-diameter gas pipeline in Lee County, Illinois. Two others were seriously injured. The explosion was on Kinder Morgan’s Natural Gas Pipeline Company of America, a 9,200-mile long system that transports natural gas from Texas and Louisiana to Chicago; Kinder Morgan issued a force majeure notice on the pipeline indicating a “third-party strike” as the reason for taking part of the Illinois Lateral out of service.
 On December 6, a gas pipeline exploded and burned in Eddy County, New Mexico. Residents within two miles of the site were evacuated, and several roads in the area were closed. There were no injuries.
 On December 13, an Energy Transfer Partners gas pipeline exploded and burned in Burleson County, Texas. There were no injuries reported.
 On December 31, four workers were injured while working on a 10-inch gas main in Boston, Massachusetts when the gas ignited. Gas had to burn a number of hours due to cold conditions, which prevented the shutting down of gas in the area.

References 

Lists of pipeline accidents in the United States